The 1995 Women's Hockey Champions Trophy was the 5th edition of the Hockey Champions Trophy for women. It was held between 9–17 September 1995 in Mar del Plata, Argentina.

Australia won the tournament for the third consecutive time after defeating South Korea 4–3 in the final on penalty strokes after a 1–1 draw.

Teams
The participating teams were determined by International Hockey Federation (FIH):

 (defending champions and champions of 1994 World Cup)
 (champions of 1992 Summer Olympics)
 (host nation)
 (third in 1994 World Cup)
 (fourth in 1994 World Cup)
 (fifth in 1994 World Cup)

Squads

Head Coach: Sergio Vigil

Mariana Arnal (GK)
Sofía MacKenzie
Marisa López
Silvia Corvalán
Anabel Gambero
Julieta Castellán
Gabriela Pando
Gabriela Sánchez (c)
Vanina Oneto
Jorgelina Rimoldi
Karina Masotta
María Castelli
Verónica Artica (GK)
Valeria Almada
Magdalena Aicega
Ximena Camardón

Head Coach: Ric Charlesworth

Justine Sowry (GK)
Katie Allen
Nikki Mott
Alyson Annan
Juliet Haslam
Jenn Morris
Alison Peek
Lisa Powell
Clover Maitland (GK)
Kate Starre
Renita Farrell
Jackie Pereira
Nova Peris
Rechelle Hawkes (c)
Claire Mitchell-Taverner
Michelle Andrews

Bianca Heinz (GK)
Birgit Beyer (GK)
Philippa Suxdorf
Katrin Kauschke
Nadine Ernsting-Krienke
Simone Thomaschinski
Irina Kuhnt
Melanie Cremer
Franziska Hentschel (c)
Tanja Dickenscheid
Eva Hagenbäumer
Britta Becker
Natascha Keller
Denise Klecker
Heike Lätzsch
Ilhem Merabet

You Jae-sook (GK)
Choi Eun-kyung
Cho Eun-jung
Oh Seung-shin
Lim Jeong-sook
Kim Myung-ok
Chang Eun-jung (c)
Lee Ji-young
Lee Eun-kyung
Kwon Soo-hyun
Woo Hyun-jung
Choi Moon-hee
Lee Eun-young
Jeon Young-sun
Kwon Chang-sook
Jin Deok-san (GK)

Elena Carrión (GK)
Natalia Dorado (c)
Nuria Moreno
María Carmen Barea
Silvia Manrique
Nagore Gabellanes
Mireia Hernandez
Sonia Barrio
Mónica Rueda
Lucía López
María del Mar Feito
Maider Tellería
Elena Urquizu
Begoña Larzabal
Sonia de Ignacio
Maribel Martinez (GK)

Head Coach: Pam Hixon

Patty Shea (GK)
Cindy Werley
Katie Kauffman
Marcia Pankratz
Eleanor Stone
Diane Madl
Kris Fillat
Kelli James
Tracey Fuchs
Antoinette Lucas
Pam Neiss
Andrea Wieland (GK)
Leslie Lyness
Barbara Marois (c)
Jill Reeve
Pamela Bustin

Results
All times are Argentina Time (UTC−03:00)

Pool

Classification

Fifth and sixth place

Third and fourth place

Final

Statistics

Final standings

Goalscorers

References

External links
Official FIH website

1995
1995 in women's field hockey
hockey
International women's field hockey competitions hosted by Argentina
Sport in Mar del Plata
September 1995 sports events in South America